Live in NYC may refer to:

 Live in NYC (Jane's Addiction album), album and DVD released in 2013
 Live in NYC 12/31/92, 2006 album by Pearl Jam
 Live in NYC - 1975: Red Patent Leather, 1985 album by New York Dolls
 Live in NYC '97, 1998 album by Johnny Winter
 Live In NYC, 1996 album by Alan Licht with Loren Mazzacane Connors
 Live in NYC, 2009 album by Chris Brokaw and Wrekmeister Harmonies
 Live in NYC, 2008 album by Dana Fuchs
 Live in NYC, 2008 album by Dan Donnelly (singer)
 Live in NYC, 2013 Grammy-nominated album by Gretchen Parlato
 Live in NYC, 5-song CD released in 2004 by Toothless George & His One-Man Band
 Live in NYC, 2011 album by VAST
 Brazilian Girls: Live in NYC , 2005 video by the Brazilian Girls
 Oceania: Live in NYC, 2013 concert film by The Smashing Pumpkins
 The Living Room - Live in NYC - Vol.1, 2002 compilation CD recorded at The Living Room
 Too Tough to Die Live in NYC, 2003 album by Dee Dee Ramone
 You + Me – Live in NYC, 2013 album by The Polyphonic Spree

See also
 Live in New York City (disambiguation)
 Live in New York (disambiguation)